The Germany woman's national cricket team is the team that represents the country of Germany in international women's cricket matches. The team is organised by German Cricket Federation and has been an associate member of the International Cricket Council (ICC) since 1999. Germany was previously an affiliate member from 1991 to 1999.

History
In April 2018, the ICC granted full Women's Twenty20 International (WT20I) status to all its members. Therefore, all Twenty20 matches played between Germany women and another international ICC member side after 1 July 2018 will be a full WT20I. On 26 June 2019, in the opening fixture of the 2019 ICC Women's Qualifier Europe tournament, Germany played their first ever WT20I match.

Germany was invited to the 2022 Kwibuka Women's T20 Tournament in Rwanda, becoming one of the first two non-African teams to participate in the tournament along with Brazil. Germany lost seven consecutive matches in the round-robin stage of the tournament, before defeating Botswana in the seventh-place play-off.

Tournament history

ICC Women's World Twenty20 Europe Qualifier
 2019: 3rd (DNQ)
 2021: 4th (DNQ)

European Championship
 2016: 2nd

Records and statistics
International Match Summary — Germany Women
 
Last updated 3 July 2022

Twenty20 International 
 Highest team total: 198/0 v. Austria on 14 August 2020 at Seebarn Cricket Ground, Lower Austria.
 Highest individual score: 105*, Janet Ronalds v. Austria on 13 August 2020 at Seebarn Cricket Ground, Lower Austria.
 Best individual bowling figures: 5/1, Anuradha Doddaballapur v. Austria on 14 August 2020 at Seebarn Cricket Ground, Lower Austria.

Most T20I runs for Germany Women

Most T20I wickets for Germany Women

T20I record versus other nations

Records complete to WT20I #1160. Last updated 3 July 2022.

Squad

This lists all the players who played for Germany in the past 12 months or were named in the most recent squad. Updated on 17 Jun 2022.

See also
 Germany national cricket team
 List of Germany women Twenty20 International cricketers

References

External links
 Official site
 FemaleCricket-Germany
 Cricinfo-Germany

Women
 
Women's cricket in Germany
Women's national cricket teams